Events from the year 1932 in Scotland.

Incumbents 

 Secretary of State for Scotland and Keeper of the Great Seal – Sir Archibald Sinclair, Bt until 28 September; then Sir Godfrey Collins

Law officers 
 Lord Advocate – Craigie Mason Aitchison
 Solicitor General for Scotland – Wilfrid Normand

Judiciary 
 Lord President of the Court of Session and Lord Justice General – Lord Clyde
 Lord Justice Clerk – Lord Alness
 Chairman of the Scottish Land Court – Lord St Vigeans

Events 
 26 May – the Scots law case of Donoghue v Stevenson is decided in the House of Lords, establishing the modern concept of a duty of care in cases of negligence.
 26 September – first contingent of the National Hunger March leaves Glasgow.
 16 November – a colliery explosion at Cardowan kills 11 miners.
 Wendy Wood leads a group of nationalists into Stirling Castle, at this time an Army barracks as well as a heritage attraction, to tear down the Union flag and replace it with a Scottish standard.
 Finnieston Crane begins operation.
 Etive Bridge, Stirling, built.
 A flock of Soay sheep is translocated from Soay to Hirta (also in the depopulated St Kilda archipelago) by conservationist John Crichton-Stuart, 4th Marquess of Bute.
 Edinburgh Synagogue is opened.

Births 
 4 January – Dick Douglas, Labour, later SNP, Member of Parliament (died 2014)
 19 January – George MacBeth, poet and novelist (died 1992 in Ireland)
 20 February – Tom Patey, mountaineer (died in climbing accident 1970)
 24 February – Ian McNeill, footballer (died 2017)
 12 March – Rory McEwen, artist and musician (died 1982 in England)
 21 March – Thomas Welsh Watson, stage, television and film actor (died 2001)
 8 April – Joan Lingard, writer (died 2022)
 11 April – James Morrison, painter (died 2020)
 4 May – Sandy MacAra, epidemiologist (died 2012 in England)
 8 May – Phyllida Law, actress
 15 May – Joseph Beltrami, defence lawyer (died 2015)
 2 June
 Tom Nairn, political theorist and academic
 Jim Petrie, comic artist (died 2014)
 5 June – Robert Maxwell Ogilvie, classical scholar (died 1981)
 8 June – Ian Kirkwood, Lord Kirkwood, lawyer and judge
 1 July – Donny MacLeod, television presenter (died 1984)
 9 July – Jimmy Reid, trade unionist (died 2010)
 20 July – Iain MacKintosh, singer and songwriter (died 2006)
 9 August – Tam Dalyell, Labour Member of Parliament (died 2017)
 13 August – John Bannerman, historian of Gaelic Scotland (died 2008)
 3 October – Tommy Preston, footballer (died 2015)
 11 October – Billie Anthony, born Philomena Levy, singer (died 1991 in England)
 28 October – Ewen Fergusson, Scotland international rugby union player and diplomat (died 2017)
 25 November – Maureen Swanson, actress, Countess of Dudley (died 2011)

Deaths 
 8 January – William Graham, Scottish politician (born 1887)
 25 January – James Paterson, painter (born 1854)
 11 February – Robert Gibb, painter (born 1845)
 31 March – Thomas David Anderson, amateur astronomer (born 1853)
 14 April – Cynicus (Martin Anderson), satirical cartoonist and postcard publisher (born 1854)
 8 July – John Wilson, Lord Ashmore, Sheriff 1900–20, Senator of the College of Justice 1930–28 (born 1857)
 16 September – James Whitelaw Hamilton, landscape painter (born 1860)
 William Gillies, nationalist (born 1865)

The arts
 Jenny Brown's short documentary film Da Makkin' O' A Keshie is made.
 Lewis Grassic Gibbon's novel Sunset Song, first of his A Scots Quair trilogy, is published.
 Fionn MacColla's novel The Albannach is published.

See also 
 Timeline of Scottish history
 1932 in Northern Ireland

References 

 
Scotland
Years of the 20th century in Scotland
1930s in Scotland